Hamsaladeevi is a village in Diviseema, Koduru Mandal, Krishna District of the Indian state of Andhra Pradesh. In the regional language it translated as "Swans Island".In this place Krishna River converges into the Bay of Bengal. The Krishna River meets the Bay of Bengal outside the village of Hamsaladeevi.

There is also an old Venugopalaswamy (Lord Krishna) temple at Hamsaladeevi. The temple is one of the 108 Vishnu temples. It was constructed during the rule of Chola kings.

The place where krishna river meets the sea is known as Sagara Sangamam. Avanigadda is nearest city.

The place where the River Krishna meets the Bay of Bengal at Hamsaladeevi is known as "Sagara Sangamam" . Here at Sagara Sangamam we can see three colours of water where the river meets the Bay. It is a must visit place in Hamsaladeevi.

References

Villages in Krishna district
Krishna River